George Frederick Burr (5 November 1819 – 5 December 1857) was an English first-class cricketer and Anglican priest.

Burr was born in Marylebone and educated at Maidstone Grammar School and St John's College, Cambridge. He was awarded a cricket blue in 1840, appearing for Cambridge University in three first-class matches in 1840 and 1841. After graduating he was ordained as a Church of England priest and was curate at Frittenden, Kent, 1844–55. He became curate at Worlingworth with Southolt, Suffolk, in 1856 but died at Dennington, also in Suffolk, in 1857.

Notes

1819 births
1857 deaths
Cambridge University cricketers
English cricketers
People educated at Maidstone Grammar School
Alumni of St John's College, Cambridge
19th-century English Anglican priests